"Back to Back" is a single co-written and recorded by American country music artist Jeanne Pruett.  Released in October 1979, it was the second single from the album Encore!. The song reached #3 on the Billboard Hot Country Singles chart in 1980, becoming her first Top Ten single on that chart since 1973's "I'm Your Woman".

Charts

Weekly charts

Year-end charts

References 

1979 singles
Jeanne Pruett songs
1979 songs